Bundelkhand Literature Festival is a literary festival held annually in Jhansi, a part of Bundelkhand region, in Uttar Pradesh, India.

History 
Bundelkhand Literature Festival was founded in 2020 by social activist Chandra Pratap Singh, who serves as the founder and director of the festival. It was started with the aim of promoting the art and literature of Bundelkhand region.

2020 Edition 
The first edition of the Bundelkhand Literature Festival started at the Craft Fairground near the Jhansi Fort in Jhansi on 28 February 2020. It was attended by more than two dozen literary figures from the fields of Hindi and Bundeli literature, dramatics, journalism, cinema and television. It held discussions on different aspects of Bundeli and Hindi literature and culture. The festival was organized by the joint aegis of the Department of Hindi, Bundelkhand University and Bundelkhand Literature Festival Society.

The inaugural session of the festival was presided over by Prof J.V. Vaishampayan, the vice-chancellor of Bundelkhand State University. It was attended by eminent personalities, including Hindi novelist Maitri Pushpa, Padma Shri awardee Kailash Madbaiya and actor Raja Bundela.

Participants 
The following literary figures participated in the 2020 BLF.

 Maitreyi Pushpa
 Padmashree Kailash Madbaiya
 Richa Anirudh
 Anikta Jain
 Naveen Chaudhary
 Aazam Quadri
 Prahlad Agrawal
 Indrajeet Singh
 Dinesh Shankar Shailendra
 Indira Dangi
 Kuldeep Raghav
 Geet Chaturvedi
 Vivek Mishra
 Raja Bundela
 Sushmita Mukherjee
 Dr. Sharad Singh
 Dr. Pankaj Chaturvedi
 Prof J.V. Vaishampayan

2021 Edition 
In 2021, the festival was cancelled due to the COVID-19 pandemic restrictions imposed by the government.

2022 Edition 
The event was scheduled from 14 October 2022 to 16 October 2022.

Participants 
 Richa Anirudh
 Maitreyi Pushpa

See also 

 List of literary festivals in India
 Lucknow Literary Festival
 Gorakhpur Literary Fest

References

External links 
 Official website
Literary festivals in India
Festivals in Uttar Pradesh
Culture of Uttar Pradesh
Jhansi
Bundelkhand
Festivals established in 2020
2020 establishments in Uttar Pradesh